Takoma Academy is a parochial, co-educational high school located in Takoma Park, Maryland operated by the Potomac Conference of Seventh-day Adventists.
It is a part of the Seventh-day Adventist education system, the world's second largest Christian school system.

History
Takoma Academy began in 1904 as part of the Washington Training Institute (now Washington Adventist University. It became an independent institute in 1932 and moved to its current location in 1952. Takoma Academy, formerly housed on the college campus, has been transferred to a separate campus and provided with a new modern building
with capacity for more than three hundred students. Educational Progress in North American Division. J.P. Laurence was principal from 1947–1980 and led the school to accreditation by the Middle States Association of Colleges and Secondary Schools.

Academics
The required curriculum includes classes in the following subject areas: Religion, English, Oral Communications, Social Studies, Mathematics, Science, Physical Education, Health, Computer Applications, Fine Arts, and Electives.

Spiritual aspects
All students take religion classes each year that they are enrolled. These classes cover topics in biblical history and Christian and denominational doctrines. Instructors in other disciplines also begin each class period with prayer or a short devotional thought, many which encourage student input. Weekly, the entire student body gathers together in the auditorium for an hour-long chapel service.
Outside the classrooms there is year-round spiritually oriented programming that relies on student involvement.

Notable alumni
Leonard Bailey - transplant surgeon
Stewart W. Bainum Jr. - Chairman and CEO of Manor Care, Inc. and Choice Hotels International; former Maryland State Delegate
Tamir Goodman - basketball player
Naji Marshall - NBA basketball player for the New Orleans Pelicans.  Attended one year.
Carlo Sanchez - Maryland State Delegate
Tony Skinn - basketball player and coach
Ted Wilson - President of the General Conference of Seventh-day Adventists

See also

 List of Seventh-day Adventist secondary schools
 Seventh-day Adventist education

References

External links
 
 http://www.taalumni.org/ Takoma Academy Alumni Association, Inc. - TAAA ) - TAAA is a year-round service-oriented association that serves Takoma Academy alumnus, current students & faculty and the surrounding community.

Private high schools in Maryland
Educational institutions established in 1904
Adventist secondary schools in the United States
Schools in Montgomery County, Maryland
Buildings and structures in Takoma Park, Maryland
1904 establishments in Maryland